Paolo Tramezzani (born 30 July 1970) is an Italian football manager and former player, who played as a defender. He was most recently the manager of FC Sion.

Playing career
Tramezzani was born at Castelnovo ne' Monti in Emilia. At the age of nine he joined Inter Milan, where he rose through the ranks. In order to gain experience he first spent a season on loan at Prato in Serie C1, followed by a season in Serie B with Cosenza in co-ownership deal, and then another season on loan in Serie B with Lucchese.

Inter included him in the squad for the 1992/93-season, and handed him his debut on 28 October 1992 in a cup match against Foggia. He spent two seasons as a squad member at Inter, but did not manage to become a regular in his preferred position at left-back. He played a total of 34 games in all competitions for Inter. He spent the two following seasons on loan at Venezia and Cesena in Serie B, before being released to join fellow Serie A-side Piacenza in 1995.

Having spent two seasons in Serie A playing regularly with Piacenza, he was signed for £1.5 million by Tottenham Hotspur in the summer of 1998, managed at the time by Christian Gross. Although scoring on his debut in a friendly against Peterborough United, his time at Spurs was short-lived. He was transferred to Pistoese in Italy for £400,000. He later returned to Piacenza, and spent a short spell at Atalanta, before ending his career with five seasons in Serie C1 with Pro Patria.

Managerial career
From 2011 to 2016, Tramezzani was assistant coach of the Albania national team, under manager Gianni De Biasi.

On 21 December 2016, he was presented as head coach of Lugano. In June 2017, Tramezzani was appointed head coach of Sion before being sacked in October.

In October 2018, Tramezzani was appointed as the new manager of APOEL. He guided them to their seventh league title after a 3–0 home victory over Apollon Limassol, and also reached the final of the Cypriot Cup, where they lost 0–2 to AEL Limassol.

Tramezzani was sacked on 8 August 2019 following a 1–2 loss against Qarabağ in the first leg of the UEFA Champions League third qualifying round.

On 10 December 2019, he was hired by Serie B club Livorno, in last place in the league table at the time. He was dismissed by Livorno on 3 February 2020 after the team only achieved 2 draws and 5 losses in 7 games under Tramezzani's helm.

In June 2020, he returned to FC Sion for a second spell as manager of the club. On 18 January 2021, he was appointed by Hajduk Split as head coach. He finished the season in fourth place, taking Hajduk to the Europa Conference League second qualifying round, before leaving the club on 27 May by mutual consent.

On 18 June 2021, Tramezzani was appointed as the manager of Saudi Arabian club Al-Faisaly.

He successively signed for Swiss Super League club FC Sion, being later replaced by Fabio Celestini on 21 November 2022. Following a five game win drought and a humiliating 2–7 defeat at home to FC St. Gallen on 12 November 2022, he was terminated on 20 November 2022.

Managerial statistics

Honours

Player
Inter Milan
UEFA Cup: 1993–94

Manager
APOEL
Cypriot First Division: 2018–19

References

External links

1970 births
Living people
Sportspeople from the Province of Reggio Emilia
Italian footballers
Inter Milan players
A.C. Prato players
Cosenza Calcio 1914 players
A.C. Cesena players
S.S.D. Lucchese 1905 players
Venezia F.C. players
Piacenza Calcio 1919 players
Tottenham Hotspur F.C. players
U.S. Pistoiese 1921 players
Atalanta B.C. players
Premier League players
Aurora Pro Patria 1919 players
UEFA Cup winning players
Serie A players
Serie B players
Italian expatriate footballers
Expatriate footballers in England
Italian expatriate sportspeople in Switzerland
Italian expatriate sportspeople in England
FC Sion managers
APOEL FC managers
Association football defenders
Italian football managers
U.S. Livorno 1915 managers
Serie B managers
Expatriate football managers in Croatia
HNK Hajduk Split managers
Italian expatriate football managers
Italian expatriate sportspeople in Saudi Arabia
Expatriate football managers in Saudi Arabia
Saudi Professional League managers
Al-Faisaly FC managers
Footballers from Emilia-Romagna